"Run Through the Jungle" is a 1970 song by American rock band Creedence Clearwater Revival.

History
The song was written by Creedence's lead singer, guitarist and songwriter, John Fogerty. It was included on their 1970 album Cosmo's Factory, the group's fifth album.  The song's title and lyrics, as well as the year it was released (1970), have led many to assume that the song is about the Vietnam War.  The fact that previous Creedence Clearwater Revival songs such as "Fortunate Son" were protests of the Vietnam War added to this belief.

However, in a 2016 interview, Fogerty explained that the song is actually about the proliferation of guns in the United States.

The song's opening and closing both featured jungle sound effects created by, according to the band's bassist Stu Cook, "lots of backwards recorded guitar and piano." The harmonica part on the song was played by John Fogerty. The song was also Tom Fogerty's favorite CCR song: "My all-time favorite Creedence tune was 'Run Through the Jungle'. . . . It's like a little movie in itself with all the sound effects. It never changes key, but it holds your interest the whole time. It's like a musician's dream. It never changes key, yet you get the illusion it does."

Ultimate Classic Rock critic Bryan Wawzenek rated the lyrics of "Run Through the Jungle" as Fogerty's 8th greatest, saying "Fogerty has written many songs cloaked in ominous foreboding...But the danger in the song feels just a little more imminent, especially when you’ve got Satan on your tail."

Controversy

The song was later the subject of controversy when Saul Zaentz, the boss of CCR's record label, Fantasy Records, which  owns the distribution and publishing rights to the music of Creedence Clearwater Revival, brought a series of lawsuits against John Fogerty, including a claim that the music from  Fogerty's 1984 song "The Old Man Down the Road" was too similar to "Run Through the  Jungle." Zaentz won some of his claims against Fogerty, but lost on the copyright issue (Fantasy, Inc. v. Fogerty). The judge found that a songwriter cannot plagiarize himself.  After winning the case, Fogerty sued Zaentz for the cost of defending himself against the copyright infringement claim. In such (copyright) cases, prevailing defendants seeking recompense were bound to show that original suit was frivolous or made in bad faith.

Fogerty v. Fantasy, Inc. became precedent when the United States Supreme Court (1993) overturned lower court rulings and awarded attorneys' fees to Fogerty, without Fogerty having to show that Zaentz's original suit was frivolous.

In popular culture
"Run Through the Jungle" has appeared in films such as Air America (1990), My Girl (1991), Rudy (1993), The Big Lebowski (1998), Radio Arrow (1998), Tropic Thunder (2008), The Sapphires (2012), Kong: Skull Island (2017), Triple Frontier (2019), and the trailer for Jungle Cruise (2021).

In television, the song is used in season 3 episode 1 of Hardcastle and McCormick, season 2 of Fargo, season 1 episode 8 of Lethal Weapon and season 4 episode 19 of the 2018 TV series Magnum P.I.

The song has appeared in many video games that depict the Vietnam War, notably licensed for Rising Storm 2: Vietnam and in the reveal trailer for Call of Duty Black Ops Cold War.

Cover versions 

The song has been covered by The Gun Club, Bruce Springsteen, The Georgia Satellites, 8 Eyed Spy, Killdozer, Link Wray, The Cramps, Sacred Cowboys, Jeff Healey, Los Lobos, and Kamyaniy Gist.

References

External links
Columbia Law School case summary of Fantasy v. Fogerty  

Creedence Clearwater Revival songs
1970 songs
Songs written by John Fogerty
Song recordings produced by John Fogerty
Swamp rock songs
Fantasy Records singles
Protest songs